The Rise and Fall of a White Collar Hooligan is a 2012 British crime film directed by Paul Tanter and starring Nick Nevern, Simon Phillips, Rita Ramnani, and Billy Murray.

Plot
An unemployed football fanatic named Mike Jacobs (played by Nick Nevern) becomes a major credit card fraudster and gangster. The movie depicts the lifestyles of luxury, frivolous spending and violent reprisals of its criminal underworld. Alongside the main character is Mike's old friend named Eddie (played by Simon Phillips) who introduces Mike into the business of the fraud. There is also the portrayal of Mike's girlfriend Katie (played by Rita Ramnani) who is faithful to Mike but not supportive of Mike's choice of lifestyle.

Cast
 Nick Nevern ... Mike Jacobs
 Simon Phillips ... Eddie Hill
 Rita Ramnani ... Katie
 Peter Barrett... Topbeef
 Rebecca Ferdinando ... Nicey Pricey
 Roland Manookian ... Rusty
 Billy Murray ... Mr. Robinson

Reception
The Times described the film as "a dim-witted Football Factory knock-off". Film critic, Jason Solomons, described it a crudely scripted, dim British film. Screenjabber said the script was "peppered with humour throughout" and described some scenes as "a joy to watch."

External links

References

2012 films
British crime films
2010s English-language films
Hooliganism
2010s British films